Terrell Antoine Fletcher (born September 14, 1973) is a former American football running back in the National Football League, spending his entire 8-year professional football career as running back for the San Diego Chargers. He attended the University of Wisconsin–Madison where he played football as running back for the Wisconsin Badgers, Rose Bowl Champions in 1994. In 1995, Terrell was named MVP in the Hall of Fame Outback Bowl. With the Chargers, Terrell rushed for 1,871 yards and gained 1,943 yards receiving, leading all Charger running backs in receptions for five consecutive seasons, from 1996-2000. He is the older brother of former Indianapolis Colts tight end Bryan Fletcher. On November 4, 2001, he caught Drew Brees's first completion.

Terrell graduated from Hazelwood East High School in Hazelwood, Missouri in 1991. Terrell is a first-generation college graduate. He graduated from the University of Wisconsin–Madison with a bachelor's degree in English Literature (1998). In 2003, Terrell graduated with a master's degree in Religious Studies, from Southern California Seminary. He is also has a Doctorate of Transformational Leadership from Bakke Graduate University (2018).

Terrell is currently an ordained Bishop and Senior Pastor for City of Hope International Church in San Diego, California  and married to Kavalya Fletcher (formerly Kavalya Young).

College statistics
1991: 446 rushing yards and 4 touchdowns on 109 carries. 17 catches for 125 yards and 1 touchdown.
1992: 496 rushing yards on 96 carries. 5 catches for 75 yards and 1 touchdown.
1993: 996 rushing yards and 9 touchdowns on 165 carries. 13 catches for 131 yards and 1 touchdown.
1994: 1,476 rushing yards and 12 touchdowns on 244 carries. 23 catches for 180 yards and 1 touchdown.

Professional career

San Diego Chargers
Terrell Fletcher was drafted with the 19th pick in the second round (51st pick overall) of the 1995 NFL Draft by the San Diego Chargers. In 1996, Fletcher was a restricted free agent for the Chargers, and was re-signed. In 2000, Fletcher led the Chargers in rushing, rushing for 384 yards on 116 carries. He was the last player until Mike Tolbert in 2010 to lead the Chargers in rushing yards that wasn't LaDainian Tomlinson. To make room for newly acquired wide receiver Tim Dwight, whom the Chargers acquired via trade from the Atlanta Falcons on draft day 2001, the Chargers released Fletcher, who agreed to re-sign at a later date. On April 23, 2001, he signed a 4-year $6.3 million contract to return to San Diego. In 2002, Fletcher was limited to just 10 games, missing time with a sprained ankle he suffered in an early October loss to the Denver Broncos. On February 27, 2003, the Chargers released Fletcher, saving $1.64 million in cap space. At the same time of releasing Fletcher, they released a slew of other veterans including safety Rodney Harrison and wide receiver Curtis Conway, among others. Fletcher was known for his receiving skills out of the backfield, leading all Charger running backs in receptions for five consecutive seasons, from 1996-2000. This included finishing second on the team in receptions with 61 in 1996. At the time of his release, Fletcher was 13th in Chargers history in rushing, with 1,871 yards, and 9th in Chargers history with 259 receptions.

NFL career statistics

Personal life
As of March 2012, he is the Senior Pastor of the City of Hope International Church in San Diego, California. In 2007, Fletcher married Sheree Zampino, the ex-wife of Will Smith. Through this marriage he was the stepfather to Zampino and Smith’s son Trey. The couple divorced in 2015 after eight years of marriage. Contrary to popular belief, the pair does not have a daughter. In 2018, Fletcher married Kavalya Young. The couple have three children, a daughter Kya and fraternal twins, son Kingston and daughter Kory.

Personal Website: www.terrellfletcher.com
Speaking Website: www.meetterrell.com
Church Website: www.thecityonline.org

References

1973 births
Living people
American football running backs
San Diego Chargers players
Wisconsin Badgers football players
Players of American football from St. Louis
African-American players of American football
20th-century African-American sportspeople
21st-century African-American sportspeople